The 1983–84 season was Cardiff City F.C.'s 57th season in the Football League. They competed in the 22-team Division Two, then the second tier of English football, finishing fifteenth.

Manager Len Ashurst resigned to become Sunderland manager towards the end of the season and his assistant Jimmy Goodfellow and defender Jimmy Mullen were appointed joint caretaker managers for the remainder of the season.

Players

Source

League standings

Results by round

Fixtures and results

Second Division

Source

Milk Cup

FA Cup

Welsh Cup

References

Bibliography

Welsh Football Data Archive

1983-84
English football clubs 1983–84 season
Welsh football clubs 1983–84 season